Le Moustier is an archeological site consisting of two rock shelters in Peyzac-le-Moustier, a village in the Dordogne, France. It is known for a complete skeleton of the species Homo neanderthalensis that was discovered in 1908. The Mousterian tool culture is named after Le Moustier, which was first excavated from 1863 by the Englishman Henry Christy and the Frenchman Édouard Lartet. In 1979, Le Moustier was inscribed on the UNESCO World Heritage List along with other nearby archeological sites as part of the Prehistoric Sites and Decorated Caves of the Vézère Valley.

Skeleton 
The skeleton known as "Le Moustier" is estimated to be approximately 45,000 years old. The characteristics of its skull include a large nasal cavity and a somewhat less developed brow ridge and occipital bun, as might be expected in a juvenile.

After discovery, the skull was dismantled, cast and reconstructed at least four times. During this process, the skull received considerable amounts of damage; for example, after it was sold to the Ethnological Museum of Berlin, a dentist broke the alveolar bone to access the teeth. It was later damaged in the Allied bombing of Berlin during the Second World War, then looted by the USSR, which returned the remains of the skull to the German Democratic Republic in 1958. The skull is now missing many parts, the teeth glued into the wrong position, and it has been dipped into glue, covered with varnish, and painted with plaster. Consequently, its scientific value is much reduced.

See also
 List of fossil sites (with link directory)
 List of hominina (hominid) fossils (with images)

References

External links
 

1863 archaeological discoveries
Prehistoric sites in France
Archaeological type sites
Neanderthal sites
Mousterian
Rock shelters
Buildings and structures in Dordogne
Prehistoric Sites and Decorated Caves of the Vézère Valley